Liliana Palaia Pérez (born 1951) is an Argentine-born architect and painter who resides and works in Valencia, Spain.

Biography
She soon returned to ETSAV to complete her Doctoral courses, culminating with the defense of her thesis Funciones y desarrollo del mercado central de Valencia, y sus implicaciones en la vida urbana (Functions and Development of the Central Market of Valencia, and its Implications for Urban Life) in 1982, directed by Dr. .

In 1978 she was hired as Professor in charge of ETSAV's Construction Department, becoming a full-time Collaborating Professor in 1984. She obtained the position of Associate Professor in 1986, and Full Professor in 2000, working at the university until she retired in 2012.

In 1984 she completed the ICCROM International Course on Wood Conservation Technology, taught in Trondheim, Norway, specializing in the field of conservation of historic wooden structures. From 1987 to 1989 she moved to England on an academic visa to complete the course Historic Building Conservation at the Architectural Association School of Architecture in London. There she attained a Diploma in Building Conservation, after her defense of the thesis Compatible Systems of Repair in Arches, Vaults and Domes (07-1989). The research work for her chair was carried out from 1998 to 2000 on overlapping roof structures in historical buildings of the Valencian Community.

She also freely practiced her profession from 1978 to 1984, when she focused on her teaching and research work.

Architectural work
From 1978 to 1984, the year in which she became exclusively dedicated to the Technical University of Valencia, Palaia Pérez worked on new construction projects for housing structures in the city of Valencia, as well as several single-family homes in nearby towns.

Painting and drawing
Since retiring as a Professor at the Technical University of Valencia, Liliana Palaia Pérez has taken courses in painting and drawing at that institution, beginning her artistic career. She has participated in several group exhibitions.

Publications
 Funciones y desarrollo del Mercado Central de Valencia y sus implicaciones en la vida urbana. Palaia Pérez, Liliana; Navascués Palacio, Pedro. . Valencia: Technical University of Valencia, 1982
 El Mercado Central de Valencia. Esteban Chapapría, Julián; Palaia Pérez, Liliana; Madrid: Banco Santander, D.L. 1983
 Técnicas de intervención en elementos estructurales de madera. Palaia Pérez, Liliana; Master in Intervention Techniques in Architectural Heritage. Valencia: Technical University of Valencia, D.L. 1995
 Técnicas de intervención en arcos, bóvedas y cúpulas. Palaia Pérez, Liliana; Abdilla Muedra, Eugenio; Master in Intervention Techniques in Architectural Heritage. Valencia: Technical University of Valencia, D.L. 1995
 La conservación de la madera en los edificios antiguos. Palaia Pérez, Liliana; Technical University of Valencia, 1998, 
 "El trazado y la construcción de armaduras de pares. Casos estudiados en la comunidad valenciana", Quaderns Científics I Tècnics De Restauració Monumental, Volume 13, 2002, Provincial Council of Barcelona
 Aprendiendo a construir la arquitectura. Benlloch Marco, Javier; Blanca Giménez, Vicente; Sifre Martínez, Vicente; Palaia Pérez, Liliana; Álvarez González, María Angeles; Gil Salvador, Luisa; López Mateu, Vicente; Tormo Esteve, Santiago, 2003, 
 Vocabulario básico de construcción arquitectónica. Benlloch Marco, Javier; Palaia Pérez, Liliana; Álvarez González, María Angeles; Gil Salvador, Luisa; López Mateu, Vicente; Tormo Esteve, Santiago; Giner García, I., Valencia: Editorial UPV, D.L. 2005, 
 Estructuras de madera. Pliego de Condiciones Técnicas en la edificación, Instituto Valenciano de la Edificación, 2010
 24 Lecciones sobre conservación del patrimonio arquitectónico: su razón de ser: Master en Conservación del patrimonio arquitectónico (Título propio UPV). Palaia Pérez, Liliana; Tormo i Esteve, Santiago, Valencia: Technical University of Valencia, November 2012,

References

External links
 Curriculum Vitae at the Technical University of Valencia
 Liliana Palaia Pérez at Dialnet

1951 births
20th-century Argentine architects
20th-century Spanish architects
21st-century Spanish architects
21st-century Spanish painters
Alumni of the Architectural Association School of Architecture
Argentine expatriates in Spain
Argentine women architects
Artists from Buenos Aires
Conservation architects
Living people
Spanish women architects
Spanish women painters
University of Buenos Aires alumni
Architects from the Valencian Community
Writers from Buenos Aires
20th-century Spanish women